Sarikhanlu (also Romanized as Sārīkhānlū) is a village in Dasht Rural District, in the Central District of Meshgin Shahr County, Ardabil Province, Iran. At the 2006 census, its population was 492, in 108 families.

References 

Towns and villages in Meshgin Shahr County